Jean-Yves Bouguet Ph.D. was a member of the Computer Vision Research Group in the Department of Electrical Engineering at the California Institute of Technology, having graduated from the École Supérieure d'Ingénieurs en Électronique et Électrotechnique. Bouguet developed and holds a patent for a new method for 3D scanning based on dual-space geometry.

From 1997 until 2007, Bouguet worked at Intel Research where he contributed camera calibration ideas to the Open Source Computer Vision Library (OpenCV), based on his Matlab toolkit that he developed at Caltech. In 2007 he joined Google as senior software engineer working in their Street View group.

Awards 
 1999:  J. Walker von Brimer award for "extraordinary accomplishments in the field of 3D photography"

Accomplishments 
 Developed "Camera Calibration Toolkit" for MATLAB
 Developed method for 3D scanning

Research interests 
 Computer vision
 Computer graphics
 Three-dimensional scene modeling
 Visual navigation
 Computational geometry
 Visual calibration
 Image processing
 Early vision processes
 Machine learning and pattern recognition
 Analog VLSI for visual sensors

References

External links
Caltech: Bouguet's Homepage
MATLAB documentation: Camera Calibration Toolkit manual
OpenCV Open Source Computer Vision Library

California Institute of Technology faculty
Google employees
Living people
Year of birth missing (living people)